Hanna Wanda Skalska-Szemioth (April 29, 1921 - April or May 10, 1964)  was a Polish composer, journalist, and music educator who composed both classical and popular music, often collaborating with her husband Kazimierz Szemioth.

Skalska was born in Warsaw. She married Szemioth in 1940, then studied with Kazimierz Sikorski at the State Music College in Lodz, graduating in 1953. In the early 1950s, Skalska was a music editor with Polish Radio before teaching at the Frederic Chopin Music School until 1958. She also edited the journal Praca Swietlicowa. 

Skalska’s popular music was recorded commercially by singers such as Ludmila Jakubczak, Barbara Muszynska, and Natasza Zylska. Her compositions included:

Ballet 

Piosenka (Song; small orchestra)

Chamber 

String Quartet

Variations on a Folk Theme (clarinet and piano)

Orchestra 

Czerwona Rapsodia (Red Rhapsody; also arranged for band)

Piano 

Epigrams Miniatures

Fraszki Miniatures

Inventions

Variations

Vocal 

“Ah, Fernando again” (text by Kazimierz Szemioth)

“Although I know” (text by Kazimierz Szemioth)

“Ballada o Krakowiance” (Ballad About a Krakow Girl; a cappella choir) 

“Choc Wiem Beguine” (text by Kazimierz Szemioth)

“Kurkurydza Mambo” (text by Kazimierz Szemioth) 
”Plamy na Suficie” (Stains on the Ceiling; text by Kazimierz Szemioth) 

“Uciekam Przed Noca” (I’m Running Away from the NIght; text by Kazimierz Szemioth) 

“Wakacje z deszczem” (Holidays with Rain; text by Kazimierz Szemioth)

Listen to “Plamy Na Suficie” (Stains on the Ceiling) by Hanna Skalska and Kazimierz Szemioth

References 

Polish women composers
String quartet composers
1921 births
1964 deaths
Polish women journalists
People from Warsaw